Cool Cat may refer to:
Cool Cat (album), an album by jazz trumpeter/vocalist Chet Baker
Cool Cat (film), a 1967 animated cartoon film
Cool Cat (Hogrogian book), a picture book by Nonny Hogrogian
Cool Cat (Looney Tunes), a Warner Bros. cartoon character
Cool Cat (Pee-wee's Playhouse), a character from the television series Pee-wee's Playhouse
"Cool Cat", a song by Queen from the album Hot Space
"Cool Cats" (Scrubs), an episode of Scrubs
Cool Cat Saves the Kids, a 2015 family film directed by Derek Savage

See also 

 Cool for Cats (disambiguation)